The Hanul Nuclear Power Plant (originally the Uljin NPP Korean: 울진원자력발전소) is a large nuclear power station in the Gyeongsangbuk-do province of South Korea. The facility has six pressurized water reactors (PWRs) with a total installed capacity of 5,881 MW. The first went online in 1988.

In the early 2000s it was the third largest operational nuclear power plant in the world and the second largest in South Korea. The plant's name was changed from Uljin to Hanul in 2013.

On 4 May 2012, ground was broken for two new reactors, Shin ("new") Uljin-1 and -2 using APR-1400 reactors.

Fuel loading completed at Shin Hanul 1 in October 2021. Unit 1 achieved first criticality on 22 May 2022, 11 am local time with electricity generation expected to start in June 2022.

The APR-1400 is a Generation III PWR design with a gross capacity of 1400 MW. It is the first to use Korean-made components for all critical systems. In 2012, the reactors were expected to cost about 7 trillion won (US$6 billion), and to be completed by 2018.

Reactors

See also 

 List of nuclear power stations
 List of power stations in South Korea
 Yeonggwang Nuclear Power Station

References 

Nuclear power stations in South Korea
Nuclear power stations using pressurized water reactors
Nuclear power stations with reactors under construction